The adjective canonical is applied in many contexts to mean "according to the canon" the standard, rule or primary source that is accepted as authoritative for the body of knowledge or literature in that context. In mathematics, "canonical example" is often used to mean "archetype".

Science and technology

 Canonical form, a natural unique representation of an object, or a preferred notation for some object

Mathematics

 
 Canonical coordinates, sets of coordinates that can be used to describe a physical system at any given point in time
 Canonical map, a morphism that is uniquely defined by its main property
 Canonical polyhedron, a polyhedron whose edges are all tangent to a common sphere, whose center is the average of its vertices
 Canonical ring, a graded ring associated to an algebraic variety
 Canonical injection, in set theory
 Canonical representative, in set theory a standard member of each element of a set partition

Differential geometry
 Canonical one-form, a special 1-form defined on the cotangent bundle T*M of a manifold M
 Canonical symplectic form, the exterior derivative of this form
 Canonical vector field, the corresponding special vector field defined on the tangent bundle TM of a manifold M

Physics
 Canonical ensemble, in statistical mechanics, is a statistical ensemble representing a probability distribution of microscopic states of the system
 Canonical quantum gravity, an attempt to quantize the canonical formulation of general relativity
 Canonical stress–energy tensor, a conserved current associated with translations through space and time
 Canonical theory, a unified molecular theory of physics, chemistry, and biology
 Canonical conjugate variables, pairs of variables mathematically defined in such a way that they become Fourier transform duals
 Canonical transformation, in Hamiltonian mechanics
 Grand canonical ensemble, a probability distribution of microscopic states for an open system, which is being maintained in thermodynamic equilibrium
 Microcanonical ensemble, a theoretical tool used to analyze an isolated thermodynamic system

Computing
 Canonical Huffman code, a particular type of Huffman code with unique properties which allow it to be described in a very compact manner
 Canonical link element, an HTML element that helps webmasters prevent duplicate content issues by specifying the “canonical” or “preferred” version
 Canonical model, a design pattern used to communicate between different data formats
 Canonical name record (CNAME record), a type of Domain Name System record
 Canonical S-expressions, a binary encoding form of a subset of general S-expression
 Canonical XML, a normal form of XML, intended to allow relatively simple comparison of pairs of XML documents
 MAC address (formerly canonical number), a unique identifier assigned to network interfaces for communications on the physical network segment
 Canonicalization, a process for converting data to canonical form

Chemistry
 Canonical form, any of a set of representations of the resonance structure of a molecule each of which contributes to the real structure

Religion
 Canonical coronation, an institutional act of the pope to legally crown images venerated by the faithful through a papal bull
 Canonical hours, the divisions of the day in terms of periods of fixed prayer at regular intervals.
 Canonical law, a set of ordinances and regulations governing a Christian church or community
 Canonical texts or biblical canon, the texts accepted as part of the Bible
 Canonical gospel, the four gospels accepted as part of the New Testament
 Canonical criticism, a way of interpreting the Bible that focuses on the text of the biblical canon itself as a finished product

Businesses
 Canonical Ltd., software company that develops the Ubuntu operating system

See also

 Canon (disambiguation)
 Text corpus
 Archetype, in behavior, modern psychological theory, and literary analysis
 
 

English words
Authority